Garry Young may refer to:
 Garry Young (footballer) (born 1939), former Australian rules footballer
 Garry Young (ice hockey) (1936–1994), executive and coach in the National Hockey League

See also
Gary Younge (born 1969), British journalist
Gary Young (disambiguation)